Shendrit Deari (born 11 February 1989) is a Macedonian tennis player.

Deari has a career high ATP singles ranking of 1131 achieved on 17 March 2014. He also has a career high ATP doubles ranking of 1091, achieved on 18 March 2013. Deari hasn't won an ITF title.

Deari has represented North Macedonia at Davis Cup. In Davis Cup he has a win-loss record of 8–4.

He competed at the 2013 Mediterranean Games. In singles Deari lost against Tunisian Mohamed Haythem Abid on the first round.

Future and Challenger finals

Doubles 2 (0–2)

Davis Cup

Participations: (8–4)

   indicates the outcome of the Davis Cup match followed by the score, date, place of event, the zonal classification and its phase, and the court surface.

References

External links 
 
 
 

1989 births
Living people
Macedonian male tennis players
People from Gostivar
Competitors at the 2013 Mediterranean Games
Mediterranean Games competitors for North Macedonia